Jefferson Pereira (born June 8, 1989) is a Brazilian-born Qatari Olympic volleyball player.

References

External links
 Jefferson Pereiraon fivb

1989 births
Living people
Beach volleyball players at the 2016 Summer Olympics
Qatari beach volleyball players
Olympic beach volleyball players of Qatar
Beach volleyball players at the 2014 Asian Games
Asian Games competitors for Qatar